Omar Amer Deghayes (born November 28, 1969) is a Libyan citizen who had legal residency status with surviving members of his family in the United Kingdom since childhood. He was arrested in Pakistan in 2002. He was held by the United States as an enemy combatant at Guantanamo Bay detention camp from 2002 until December 18, 2007. He was released without charges and returned to Britain, where he lives.
His Guantanamo Internment Serial Number was 727. Deghayes says he was blinded permanently in one eye, after a guard at Guantanamo gouged his eyes with his fingers. Deghayes was never charged with any crime at Guantanamo.

When Deghayes was a child, his father, a prominent attorney and union organiser, was arrested and executed by Muammar Gaddafi's government in Libya. His mother took him and his siblings to the United Kingdom, where they had often visited for extended stays, and gained asylum as refugees. They lived in Brighton. According to the Birmingham Post, Deghayes was a "laws graduate"; he studied law at the University of Wolverhampton and later studied in Huddersfield.

During Deghaye's detention at Guantanamo, his family in Great Britain mounted a campaign to free him, which received the support of the Brighton Argus newspaper and all six Members of Parliament in Sussex, where Omar Deghayes had resided for many years. This is where his family still lives.

In 2006, the British High Court considered whether the United Kingdom government should petition the United States government on behalf of Guantánamo detainees who had legal British residency status. (It had already petitioned on behalf of British citizens.)  The High Court concluded that it did not have the authority to make recommendation in the area of foreign affairs, but said that the evidence that the British residents were being tortured was "powerful".

In August 2007, the British government under Gordon Brown requested Deghaye's release. He was released on 18 December 2007 and returned to Britain. Deghaye and another former detainee were arrested under a Spanish warrant on allegations of al-Qaeda involvement in 2003; he was released on bail while his case is considered.

Early life and education
Omar Deghayes was born in Tripoli, Libya in 1969. His father was an attorney and a prominent figure in Libya, but got at cross purposes with Muammar Gaddafi.

After his father was killed by the Libyan government in 1980, al-Walid's family was eventually able to leave in two groups, in 1985 and 1986. His mother's request for asylum in Britain in 1987. Deghayes grew up in a secular household and was granted status as a legal resident. As a college student, while studying at University of Wolverhampton and later in Huddersfield, he began to explore Islam. His mother and sister became British citizens.

Career
He became an attorney. As a young man, he started working in Afghanistan, where he worked on NGOs, efforts at education and rural development.

Marriage and family
After living in Afghanistan for some time, he married an Afghan woman and they had a child together. After his long imprisonment at Guantanamo Bay detention camp, they divorced.

Since his return to Britain in December 2007, Deghayes has married a second time.

Deghayes had three nephews fighting for Al Qaeda's al-Nusra Front in the Syrian Civil War, Amer Deghayes (20), Abdullah (18) and Jaffar (then 16).  Abdullah was killed in 2014, with Amer wounded in the same battle.  Jaffar was killed six months later at the age of just 17.

Disruption of war
After the United States invasion of Afghanistan in the fall of 2001, Deghayes moved temporarily to Pakistan for what he thought would be safety with his Afghan wife and child. He has said that he was arrested, along with his family, by bounty hunters in Pakistan. He was "sold" to the American forces and taken into military custody. He was first held and interrogated at the Bagram Theater Internment Facility. His wife and child were later released.

His attorney Clive Stafford Smith said that in 2005 an investigation by BBC Newsnight discovered that, shortly before Deghaye's arrest, an anonymous informant had mistakenly identified him to Spanish authorities as appearing in a videotape including Arab mujahideen among rebels in Chechnya. They issued a warrant for his arrest and notified the Americans, who later took him into custody in Pakistan. (The person in the videotape was later correctly identified as Abu al-Walid, an insurgent leader who was killed in Chechnya by Russians in April 2004.)  Stafford Smith has said of the mis-identification: "This was typical of the whole Guantánamo experience. They said they had evidence and they wouldn't let you see it. Then when you did, it was incorrect."

Together with many other prisoners, in 2002, Deghayes was transported to the recently constructed Guantanamo Bay detention camp and held as a suspected enemy combatant. In 2005, he claimed that Guantanamo guards held him down and sprayed pepper spray directly into his eyes.
Deghayes said a guard also gouged his eyes. He was left permanently blind in his right eye.

The DOD declined to comment on specific abuse claims.
However, DOD spokesman Lieutenant Commander Flex Plexico repeated his counter-claim that al Qaeda training manuals instruct al Qaeda members to lie about abuse, if captured, to trigger international outrage. He described Guantanamo as "...a safe, humane and professional detention operation..."

On August 10, 2007, family members released a detailed dossier listing the torture and humiliation that Deghaye claimed that he and other detainees were subjected to while in U.S. custody. The material was reported by numerous media.

Deghayes reported that he:
Saw a soldier shoot a captive.
Witnessed the partial drowning of captives (a technique later known as waterboarding).
Saw a guard throw a Koran into a toilet.
Saw a Moroccan/Italian named Abdulmalik beaten to death.
Saw another captive beaten until blood was all over the floor; the detainee was left permanently brain damaged.
Was permanently blinded when a guard stuck his finger in his eye.
Had excrement smeared on his face.
Suffered sexual abuse, which he said was too traumatic to be described in detail.
Was subjected to electric shocks.
Was kept naked in the freezing cold and had freezing water thrown on him.
Was starved for forty-five days.
Received repeated death threats.

Mistaken identification from videotape
Part of the stated case against Deghayes was that an anonymous informant had told Spanish analysts that he was one of the individuals in a Chechnyan rebel video tape. Spain had passed on this information to the United States shortly before Deghayes was taken to Guantanamo.
 An inquiry by BBC Newsnight in 2005 found that Deghayes was not on the tape. The team consulted with Professor Tim Valentine of Goldsmiths College, a facial recognition expert, who said that the face in the videotape could not possibly be that of Deghayes. For one thing, it lacked clearly identifiable marks which he carries left by a childhood injury.

In August 2007, Stafford Smith said that the face in the videotape was eventually identified as a Saudi Arabian foreign mujahideen leader in Chechnya named Abu al-Walid. Commander of a resistance group, he was killed by Russians in April 2004. Stafford Smith said the face of al-Walid looked more like Fidel Castro, the leader of Cuba, than it resembled Deghayes.

Hunger strikes
In September 2005, Deghayes was among the numerous hunger strikers, a protest that was reported as having started over the beating of the detainee Hisham Sliti.

According to an article by his attorney Clive Stafford Smith, Deghayes wrote:

I am slowly dying in this solitary prison cell, I have no rights, no hope. So why not take my destiny into my own hands, and die for a principle?

Combatant Status Review Tribunal
Initially the Bush Presidency asserted that they could withhold all the protections of the Geneva Conventions to captives from the war on terror. This policy was challenged and the United States Supreme Court heard a habeas corpus petition; it ruled in Rasul v. Bush (2004) that detainees had a right to an impartial forum to challenge their detention.

Within weeks, the Department of Defense (DOD) created and implemented the Combatant Status Review Tribunals, which it intended to replace habeas corpus hearings in federal courts. The Tribunals were empowered simply to determine whether the captive had previously been correctly classified under the Bush administration's definition of an enemy combatant.

Summary of Evidence memo
A Summary of Evidence memo was prepared for each CSRT. That for Omar Amer Deghayes's Combatant Status Review Tribunal, held on September 27, 2004, included the following allegations:

Administrative Review Board hearing

Detainees found to be "enemy combatants" were scheduled to have their dossier reviewed at annual Administrative Review Board hearings. The Administrative Review Boards were to determine whether a detainee should continue to be detained by the United States, because they continued to pose a threat, be repatriated to the custody of their home country, or set free.

First annual Administrative Review Board
A Summary of Evidence memo was prepared for Deghayes's first annual Administrative Review Board, on May 24, 2005.
"The following primary factors favor continued detention:"

The following primary factors favor release or transfer

Transcript
Omar Deghayes's Presiding Officer
concluded that he chose not to attend his Administrative Review Board hearing.

Second annual Administrative Review Board
A Summary of Evidence memo was prepared for Omar Amer Deghayes' second annual Administrative Review Board, on August 8, 2006.
The memo listed factors for and against his continued detention.

The following primary factors favor continued detention

The following primary factors favor release or transfer

Release
On August 7, 2007, the United Kingdom government requested the release of Omar Deghayes and four other detainees who had been legal British residents prior to their detention. Responding to considerable interest in the case of Deghayes and other men, the UK government warned the public that the negotiations might take months.

On December 18, 2007, Deghayes was freed from Guantanamo Bay and flown to the UK.

Spanish extradition request
Deghayes and Jamil El-Banna, another former legal British resident released at the same time, were arrested and questioned by Spanish authorities, before being required to appear in court in response to a Spanish extradition warrant. A third former detainee, Sameur Abdenour, an Algerian national and former legal resident of Britain, was questioned and released that day. Deghayes and El-Banna were accused of being al-Qaeda members in Madrid. Deghayes was freed on bail on 20 December, conditions of which include obeying a curfew and wearing an electronic tag.

On March 6, 2008, the Spanish judge Baltasar Garzón dropped the extradition request on humanitarian grounds. Garzón based his decision on a medical examination, which he made public on February 12, 2008. The report said Deghayes suffered from: "post-traumatic stress syndrome, severe depression and suicidal tendencies."  Garzón ruled the mental health of Deghayes and El-Banna had deteriorated so badly in detention that it would be cruel to prosecute them.

Torture claims investigation
On April 29, 2009, the Spanish investigating magistrate, Baltazar Garzón, initiated a formal investigation into whether confessions from Deghayes and three other former Guantanamo captives were the result of the use of abusive interrogation techniques. By this time, the Obama administration had released legal opinion memos prepared by the Office of Legal Counsel, Department of Justice, under the Bush administration, which have become known as the Torture Memos. Dating from August 2002 through May 2005, these authorized specific enhanced interrogation techniques to be used by the CIA and DOD, which have since legally held to be torture.

Deghayes and the three other men: Hamed Abderrahman Ahmed, Lahcen Ikassrien, and Jamiel Abdul Latif al Banna, had previously faced charges in Spanish courts, based on confessions they made while in US custody. Their charges were dropped in the cases of Deghayes and al Banna, based on Garzón's determination that their mental health had been adversely affected by their detention. In addition, he noted that the men said that their confessions were false and had been coerced as the result of abusive interrogation techniques.

Current status
Deghayes had a lengthy interview with Patrick Barkham, a reporter from The Guardian newspaper, published on January 21, 2010. 
In it he reviewed his entire experience of arrest and detention.

Representation in other media
Outside the Law: Stories from Guantanamo (2009), is a documentary featuring interviews with Omar Deghayes.

See also
 Omar Deghayes v. George W. Bush
 Initial Reaction Force
 Detainee abuse

References

Further reading
 How I fought to survive Guantánamo Deghayes tells his story of brutal torture and how he lost the sight in one eye in Guantanamo.
 Deghayes: The "Torture Dossier" The family of Omar Deghayes released a memo regarding his treatment in American hands.
Outside the Law: Stories from Guantanamo (2009) a documentary featuring interviews with Omar Deghayes.

External links

"Omar Deghayes", Amnesty International

Omar Deghayes's Guantanamo detainee assessment via Wikileaks
British resident blinded at Guantanamo, lawyer says (.pdf), Report prepared for the Law Society, Press Association, February 17, 2005
 Sister's Guantanamo strike fears, BBC, September 9, 2005
U.S. Military Tube-Feeds 13 Gitmo Strikers, San Francisco Chronicle, September 10, 2005
 Revealed: the diary of a British man on hunger strike in Guantanamo, The Independent, September 11, 2005
Behind barbed wire in Guantanamo, Newsday, October 3, 2005
Detainee: They blinded me, Newsday, October 3, 2005
Inmate's writings raise questions of identification, treatment at Guantanamo, Newsday, October 3, 2005
Behind barbed wire in Guantanamo, Newsday, October 3, 2005
 Justice for Omar, The Argus, November 11, 2005
  London Demonstration: Justice for the British Residents in Guantanamo Bay, Eyetopic, January 21, 2006
  
 Omar Deghayes speaks to Panorama BBC, 13 July 2009
Outside the Law: Stories from Guantanamo, documentary featuring extensive interviews with Omar Deghayes, Spectacle Productions, 2009
Omar Deghayes: 'He was brought in manacled and hooded', The Guardian, 14 July 2010
The torture files: the interrogations (LC13) The Guardian, 14 July 2010

1969 births
Living people
Libyan extrajudicial prisoners of the United States
British extrajudicial prisoners of the United States
Alumni of the University of Wolverhampton
Bagram Theater Internment Facility detainees
Libyan emigrants to the United Kingdom
Guantanamo detainees known to have been released
British torture victims
Libyan torture victims
People from Tripoli, Libya